Ferdinand Marschall (19 February 1924 – 14 November 2006) was an Austrian football referee.

Refereeing career
In 1953 Marschall became a referee in the Austrian football championship, and in 1967 he was appointed as a FIFA referee.

Marschall was chosen as a referee for the 1970 FIFA World Cup, where he officiated a group stage match between Brazil and Romania.

In 1972, Marschall was chosen as a referee for UEFA Euro 1972, where he officiated the final between West Germany and the Soviet Union.

Marschall retired from refereeing in 1974 after officiating for 21 years in the Austrian top flight.

References

External links
 Profile at worldfootball.net

1924 births
2006 deaths
Sportspeople from Timișoara
Austrian football referees
1970 FIFA World Cup referees
UEFA Euro 1972 referees
UEFA European Championship final referees